Yakshi is a sculpture in Malampuzha park, Palakkad adjacent to the Malampuzha Dam in the Indian state of Kerala. Sculptored by Kanayi Kunhiraman, its construction was completed in 1969. It is a -tall sculpture inspired by a nude female yakshi (Hinduist female spirit), with her legs spread out, breasts lifted, eyes raised to the sky in a semi-drowsy state and fingers running through her hair. The sculpture is constructed in a single piece. Kunhiraman was honoured by Kerala Government in 2019 during the 50th anniversary of the sculpture.

Criticism
The sculpture have been criticised by some people for its nudity.

References

1969 sculptures
Sculptures in India
Buildings and structures in Palakkad district
Nude sculptures